The Hongqi L5 is a large retro styled luxury car produced by Hongqi whose design was inspired by the discontinued Hongqi CA770, serving as Hongqi's flagship vehicle for the Chinese automotive market. It has a length of 5.555m, five being a lucky number in Chinese culture.

Overview
Released in 2013 at the Shanghai Auto Show, the L5 is renowned for currently being the most expensive Chinese-made car ever available for purchase, at CN¥5 million Renminbi (US$800,000 UK£580,000). It is the official state car of China, as it is used by the General Secretary of the Communist Party (Paramount leader) Xi Jinping. The sedan is currently offered only in China.

The L5 has been exported to Belarus via donations, where it is used by  the Belarusian military as a parade car, first being debuted at the 2015 Minsk Victory Day Parade.

In 2016 Hongqi announced a V8 version of the L5, powered by a 4 litre twin-turbo V8 producing 381 horsepower with an eight-speed automatic. The 6 litre V12 model is designated as CA7600 and the V8 version as CA7400. The CA7400 was released in 2017.

Reception
Jeremy Clarkson reviewed the V12 L5, (referring to it as "the Hongqi" rather than the model name) during the "Chinese food for thought" episode of The Grand Tour and, although critical of the performance—doubting the 3.2 tonne vehicle would make 60mph—and seating (also that the steering adjuster on the demo model was broken), stated "[he] didn't care about any of that, because it is just magnificent and evil—gloriously, brilliantly, evil", and that it was a "cartoon baddie's car".

References

 Glon, Ronan. "The most expensive Chinese car is a massive limousine with a retro look", Digital Trends, December 5, 2016.

External links

 Official website 
 Hongqi L5 information

L5
Cars of China
2010s cars
Limousines
Retro-style automobiles
Luxury vehicles
Flagship vehicles
Full-size vehicles
Rear-wheel-drive vehicles
All-wheel-drive vehicles